Robert Arthur Gross (March 23, 1914 – November 6, 1983) was an American composer and violinist.

A native of Colorado Springs, Colorado, where composer Cecil Effinger would be born four months later, Gross began studies under Leopold Auer and Edouard Dethier at the Juilliard School when he was twelve; while there, he also studied composition under Bernard Wagenaar. He also took private lessons with both Roger Sessions – whose violin concerto he premiered – and Arnold Schoenberg. He taught for some time at Occidental College, twice serving as chairman of the school's music department. Among his pupils there was John McGuire. Most of Gross' music was for chamber forces, but he composed two operas, one on The Bald Soprano and one, a science fiction satire, titled Project 1521; both were premiered at Occidental College, in 1962 and 1974 respectively. A handful of the chamber works appeared on records. Gross also made recordings himself, as a violinist.

Gross died in Los Angeles.  His papers are held at the University of Calgary.

References

1914 births
1983 deaths
American male classical composers
American classical composers
American classical violinists
Male classical violinists
American male violinists
Musicians from Colorado Springs, Colorado
Juilliard School alumni
Occidental College faculty
Pupils of Roger Sessions
Pupils of Arnold Schoenberg
20th-century classical composers
20th-century classical violinists
20th-century American composers
20th-century American male musicians
20th-century American violinists